Fakel Novy Urengoy  is a Russian professional men's volleyball team, based in Novy Urengoy, playing in Super League since 2004.

International competitions 
 Club World Championship
Third place (×1)  2018
 CEV Cup
Winners (×1)  2007
 CEV Challenge Cup
Winners (×1)  2017
Runners-up (×1)  2016
Domestic competitions
 Russian Super League 
Third place (×2)   2009, 2019
Russian Cup
Runners-up (×1): 2006

Team Roster

2015/2016
Head coach:  Igor Chutchev

Notable players
Notable, former or current players of club, who are medalist of intercontinental tournaments in national teams or clubs.

References

External links
Official site

Russian volleyball clubs
Sport in Yamalo-Nenets Autonomous Okrug